Syrian Arab can refer to:
Syrian Arab Airlines
Syrian Arabian horse
A member of the Arab majority in Syria, see Demographics_of_Syria#Ethnic_groups